Mahathir bin Mohamad (born 10 July 1925) is a Malaysian politician, author, and physician who served as the 4th and 7th Prime Minister of Malaysia. He held the office from July 1981 to October 2003 and later from May 2018 to March 2020 for a cumulative total of 24 years, making him the country's longest-serving prime minister, as well as the first and only person to be appointed Prime Minister twice. Before becoming premier, he served as Deputy Prime Minister and in other cabinet positions. He was a Member of Parliament for Langkawi from May 2018 to October 2022, Kubang Pasu from August 1974 to March 2004, and Kota Setar Selatan from April 1964 to May 1969. His political career has spanned more than 75 years, from joining protests opposing citizenship policies for non-Malays in the Malayan Union in the 1940s to forming the Gerakan Tanah Air coalition in 2022.

Born and raised in Alor Setar, Kedah, Mahathir excelled at school and became a physician. He became active in the United Malays National Organisation (UMNO) before entering the Parliament of Malaysia in 1964. He served one term before losing his seat, subsequently falling out with Prime Minister Tunku Abdul Rahman and being expelled from UMNO. He wrote The Malay Dilemma during this period, which formed the basis of future ethnic Malay affirmative action policies in the country. When Abdul Rahman resigned, Mahathir re-entered UMNO and parliament, and was promoted to Minister of Education from 1974 to 1978 and Minister of Trade and Industry from 1978 to 1981. He became Deputy Prime Minister in 1976. In 1981, he was sworn in as prime minister following the resignation of Hussein Onn.

During Mahathir's first tenure as prime minister, Malaysia experienced a period of rapid modernization and economic growth, and his government initiated widespread industry privatisation and a series of bold infrastructure projects. Mahathir was a dominant political figure, winning five consecutive general elections and fending off a series of rivals for UMNO's leadership. However, his power accumulation came at the expense of judicial independence and the Malaysian royalty's traditional powers and privileges. He continued pro-bumiputera affirmative action policies, but in the 1990s introduced the Bangsa Malaysia policy that saw some political liberalisation. He used the controversial Internal Security Act to detain activists, non-mainstream religious figures, and political opponents in 1987 Operation Lalang and later his own Deputy Prime Minister Anwar Ibrahim, whom he fired in 1998. Mahathir's record of curtailing civil liberties in Malaysia as well as his antagonism towards Western interests and economic policy made his relationships with Western nations difficult. As prime minister, he was an advocate of Asian development models and values, and was prominent across the Muslim world.

After retiring in 2003, Mahathir became a strident critic of his hand-picked successor Abdullah Ahmad Badawi, and later Najib Razak. In 2016, Mahathir quit UMNO over the 1MDB corruption scandal. As part of the Malaysian United Indigenous Party (BERSATU), he went on to lead the Pakatan Harapan opposition to victory in the 2018 general election. Mahathir became the first Malaysian prime minister not to represent the Barisan Nasional (BN) coalition (or its predecessor, the Alliance Party), and the first to serve non-consecutive terms. In his second tenure, Mahathir prioritised reopening investigations into the 1MDB scandal, combatting corruption and "restoring the rule of law", and cutting spending on large infrastructure projects such as those under the Belt and Road Initiative. Prior to the election, Mahathir promised to seek a pardon for Anwar Ibrahim and hand over the premiership to him after an unspecified interim period.

In 2020, Mahathir's refusal to commit to handing over the office of Prime Minister to Anwar contributed to a political crisis that led to Mahathir's resignation as Prime Minister and the collapse of the Pakatan Harapan government. At the time of his resignation, he was the world's oldest serving state leader at the age of 94. Mahathir left BERSATU in protest of its new coalition with UMNO and formed the Homeland Fighters Party and coalition Gerakan Tanah Air. Mahathir subsequently lost his parliamentary seat for Langkawi and his election deposit in the 2022 general election.

Early life and education
Mahathir was born at his parents' home in a poor neighbourhood at Lorong Kilang Ais, Alor Setar, the capital of the Malay sultanate of Kedah, which was then a British protectorate, on 10 July 1925. His mother, Wan Tempawan Wan Hanapi, was a Malay of Kedah. His father, Mohamad Iskandar, was a Penang Malay of Malay and Indian descent. Mahathir's paternal grandfather had come from Kerala, British India (present-day, India) and married a Malay woman. Another aspect of Mahathir's birth set him apart from the other first six prime ministers: he was not born into the aristocracy or a prominent religious or political family.

Mohamad was the principal of an English-medium secondary school, whose lower-middle-class status meant his daughters were unable to enroll in a secondary school. Wan Tempawan had only distant relations to members of Kedah's royalty. Both had been married previously. Mahathir was born with six half-siblings and two full-siblings. His childhood home was converted to the Mahathir Mohamad birth house complex and opened to the public.

Mahathir was a hard-working school student. Discipline imposed by his father motivated him to study, and he showed little interest in sports. He won a position in a selective English medium secondary school, having become fluent in English well ahead of his primary school peers. With schools closed during the Japanese occupation of Malaya in World War II, he started a small business, selling coffee and later pisang goreng (banana fritters) and other snacks.

After the war, Mahathir graduated from secondary school with the highest rank and enrolled to study medicine at the King Edward VII College of Medicine in Singapore. Mahathir is an alumnus of the University of Malaya. When the university granted him and his wife honorary degrees in November 2018, he said, "I will always value my stay in Singapore for nearly six years." Singapore's long-time prime minister Lee Kuan Yew was a student at the Raffles College, which merged with the King Edward VII College of Medicine in August 1949 to form the University of Malaya, with campuses located solely in Singapore.

After graduating with an MBBS medical degree in Gyneocology and Osterorician in 1953, Mahathir worked as a physician in government service. He married Siti Hasmah in 1956. He returned to Alor Setar in 1957 to set up his own practice. He was the town's first Malay physician and a successful one. He built a large house, invested in various businesses, and employed a Chinese man to chauffeur him in his Pontiac Catalina (most chauffeurs at the time were Malay).

Early political career (1959–1970)
Mahathir had been politically active since the end of Malaya's Japanese occupation, when he joined protests against citizenship granted to non-Malays under the short-lived Malayan Union. He later argued for affirmative action for Malays at medical college. While at college, he contributed to The Straits Times under the pseudonym "C.H.E. Det" and a student journal, in which he fiercely promoted Malay rights, such as restoring Malay as an official language. While practising as a physician in Alor Setar, Mahathir became active in UMNO. By the time of the first general election for the independent state of Malaya in 1959, he was the chairman of the party in Kedah.

Despite his prominence in UMNO, Mahathir was not a candidate in the 1959 election, ruling himself out following a disagreement with then Prime Minister Tunku Abdul Rahman. The relationship between the two Kedahans had been strained since Mahathir had criticised Tunku Abdul Rahman's agreement to retain British and Commonwealth forces in Malaya after independence. Tunku Abdul Rahman opposed Mahathir's plans to introduce minimum educational qualifications for UMNO candidates. For Mahathir, this was a significant enough slight to delay his entry into national politics in protest. The delay did not last for long. In the following general election in 1964, he was elected as the federal parliamentarian for the Alor Setar-based seat of Kota Setar Selatan.

Elected to parliament in a volatile political period, Mahathir, as a government backbencher, launched himself into the main conflict of the day: Singapore's future, with its large and economically powerful ethnic Chinese population, as a state of Malaysia. He vociferously attacked Singapore's dominant People's Action Party for being "pro-Chinese" and "anti-Malay" and called its leader, Lee Kuan Yew, "arrogant". Singapore was expelled from Malaysia in Mahathir's first full year in parliament. However, despite Mahathir's prominence as a backbencher, he lost his seat in the 1969 election, defeated by Yusof Rawa of the Pan-Malaysian Islamic Party (PAS). Mahathir attributed the loss of his seat to ethnic Chinese voters switching support from UMNO to PAS. Being a Malay-dominated seat, only the two major Malay parties fielded candidates, leaving Chinese voters to choose between the Malay-centric UMNO and the Islamist PAS.

Large government losses in the election were followed by the race riots of 13 May 1969. Hundreds of people were killed in clashes between Malays and Chinese. In 1968, Mahathir had predicted the outbreak of racial hostility. Outside parliament, he openly criticised the government, sending a letter to Tunku Abdul Rahman. He criticised the prime minister for failing to uphold Malay interests. The letter, which soon became public, called for Tunku Abdul Rahman's resignation. By the end of the year, Mahathir had been fired from UMNO's Supreme Council and expelled from the party. Tunku Abdul Rahman had to be persuaded not to have him arrested.

While in the political wilderness, Mahathir wrote his first book, The Malay Dilemma. He set out his vision for the Malay community. The book argued that a balance had to be achieved between enough government support for Malays so that their economic interests would not be dominated by the Chinese and exposing Malays to sufficient competition to ensure that over time, Malays would lose what Mahathir saw as the characteristics of avoiding hard work and failing to "appreciate the real value of money and property". The book continued Mahathir's criticism of Tunku Abdul Rahman's government, and it was promptly banned. The ban was only lifted after Mahathir became prime minister in 1981. He had served as a minister and deputy prime minister while being the author of a banned book. Academics R. S. Milne and Diane K. Mauzy argue that Mahathir's relentless attacks were the principal cause of Tunku Abdul Rahman's downfall and subsequent resignation as prime minister in 1970.

Rise to prominence (1970–1981)
Tunku Abdul Rahman resigned in 1970 and was replaced by Abdul Razak Hussein. Razak encouraged Mahathir back into the party and appointed him as a Senator in 1973. He rose quickly in the Razak government, returning to UMNO's Supreme Council in 1973. He was appointed to Cabinet in 1974 as the Minister for Education. He returned to the House of Representatives, winning the Kedah-based seat of Kubang Pasu unopposed in the 1974 election. One of his first acts as Minister for Education was to introduce greater government control over Malaysia's universities, despite strong opposition from the academic community. He moved to limit politics on university campuses, giving his ministry the power to discipline students and academics who were politically active and making scholarships for students conditional on the avoidance of politics.

In 1975, Mahathir ran for one of the three vice-presidencies of UMNO. The contest was considered a battle for the party's leadership succession, with Razak and his deputy, Hussein Onn, declining in health. Each of Razak's preferred candidates was elected: former Chief Minister of Melaka, Ghafar Baba; Tengku Razaleigh Hamzah, a wealthy businessman and member of Kelantan's royal family; and Mahathir. When Razak died the following year, Hussein, as his successor, was forced to choose between the three men to be deputy prime minister. He also considered the ambitious minister Ghazali Shafie.

Mahathir's rivals had significant political liabilities: Ghazali, having been defeated by the others for a vice-presidency, lacked the support of UMNO members. Ghafar had no higher education and was not fluent in English. Razaleigh was young, inexperienced and, critically, unmarried. However, Hussein's decision was not easy. Hussein and Mahathir were not close allies, and Hussein knew Mahathir's choice would displease Abdul Rahman, still alive and revered as the father of Malaysia's independence. After six weeks of indecision, Mahathir was, much to his surprise, appointed as Hussein's deputy. The appointment meant that Mahathir was the anointed successor to the prime ministership.

However, Mahathir was not an influential deputy prime minister. Hussein was a cautious leader who rejected many of Mahathir's bold policy proposals. While Hussein and Mahathir's relationship was distant, Ghazali and Razaleigh became Hussein's closest advisers, often bypassing the more senior Mahathir when accessing Hussein. Nonetheless, when Hussein relinquished power due to ill health in 1981, Mahathir succeeded him unopposed and with his blessing.

First term as prime minister (1981–2003)

Early years (1981–1987) 
Mahathir was sworn in as prime minister on 16 July 1981, at the age of 56. One of his first acts was to release 21 detainees held under the Internal Security Act, including journalist Samad Ismail and a former deputy minister in Hussein's government, Abdullah Ahmad, who had been suspected of being an underground communist. He appointed his close ally, Musa Hitam, as deputy prime minister.

Mahathir exercised caution in his first two years in power, consolidating UMNO's leadership and, with victory in the 1982 general election, the government. In 1983, Mahathir commenced the first of a number of battles he would have with Malaysia's royalty during his premiership. The position of Yang di-Pertuan Agong, the Malaysian head of state, was due to rotate into either the elderly Idris Shah II of Perak or the controversial Iskandar of Johor, who had only a few years earlier been convicted of manslaughter. Thus Mahathir had grave reservations about the two Sultans, who were both activist rulers of their own states.

Mahathir tried to pre-emptively limit the power that the new Agong could wield over his government, introducing to parliament amendments to the Constitution to deem the Agong to assent to any bill that had not been assented within 15 days of passage by Parliament. The proposal removed the power to declare a state of emergency from the Agong and place it with the prime minister. The Agong at the time, Ahmad Shah of Pahang, agreed with the proposals in principle, but baulked when he realised that the proposal would deem Sultans to assent to laws passed by state assemblies. Supported by the Sultans, the Agong refused to assent to the constitutional amendments, which had by then passed both houses of Parliament with comfortable majorities.

When the public became aware of the impasse, and the Sultans refused to compromise with the government, Mahathir took to the streets to demonstrate public support for his position in mass rallies. The press took the side of the government. A large minority of Malays, including conservative UMNO politicians, and an even larger proportion of the Chinese community supported the Sultans. After five months, the crisis was resolved, as Mahathir and the Sultans agreed to a compromise. The Agong retained the power to declare a state of emergency. However, if he refused to assent to a bill, the bill would be returned to Parliament, which could then override Agong's veto.

On the economic front, Mahathir inherited the New Economic Policy from his predecessors, which was designed to improve the economic position of the bumiputera, Malaysia's Malays and indigenous peoples, via targets and affirmative action in areas such as corporate ownership and university admission. Mahathir actively pursued privatisation of government enterprises from the early 1980s, both for the liberal economic reasons it was being pursued by contemporaries such as Margaret Thatcher, and because he felt that combined with affirmative action for the Bumiputera, it could provide economic opportunities for Bumiputera businesses. His government privatised airlines, utilities and telecommunication firms, accelerating to a rate of about 50 privatisations a year by the mid-1990s.

While privatisation generally improved the working conditions of Malaysians in privatised industries and raised significant revenue for the government, many privatisations occurred in the absence of open tendering processes and benefited Malays who supported UMNO. One of the most notable infrastructure projects at the time was the construction of the North–South Expressway, a motorway running from the Thai border to Singapore. The contract to construct the expressway was awarded to a business venture of UMNO. Mahathir oversaw the establishment of the car manufacturer Proton as a joint venture between the Malaysian government and Mitsubishi. By the end of the 1980s, Proton had overcome poor demand and losses to become, with the support of protective tariffs, the largest carmaker in Southeast Asia and a profitable enterprise.

In Mahathir's early years as prime minister, Malaysia was experiencing a resurgence of Islam among Malays. Malays were becoming more religious and more conservative. PAS, which had in the 1970s joined UMNO in government, responded to the resurgence by taking an increasingly strident Islamist stand under the leadership of Yusof Rawa, who in 1969 had defeated Mahathir for his parliamentary seat. Mahathir tried to appeal to religious voters by establishing Islamic institutions such as the International Islamic University of Malaysia which could promote Islamic education under the government's oversight.

He also attracted Anwar Ibrahim, the leader of the Malaysian Islamic Youth Movement (ABIM), to join UMNO. In some cases, Mahathir's government employed repression against more extreme exponents of Islamism. Ibrahim Libya, a popular Islamist leader, was killed in a police shoot-out in 1985. Al-Arqam, a religious sect, was banned, and its leader, Ashaari Mohammad, arrested under the Internal Security Act. Mahathir comprehensively defeated PAS at the polls in 1986, winning 83 seats of the 84 seats it contested, leaving PAS with just one MP.

Exerting power (1987–1990) 
Any illusion that the 1986 election may have created about Mahathir's political dominance was short-lived. In 1987, he was challenged for UMNO's presidency, and effectively the prime ministership, by Tengku Razaleigh Hamzah. Razaleigh's career had gone backwards under Mahathir, being demoted from the Ministry of Finance to the Ministry of Trade and Industry. Razaleigh was supported by Musa, who had resigned as deputy prime minister the previous year. While Musa and Mahathir were originally close allies, the two had fallen out during Mahathir's premiership. Musa claimed that Mahathir no longer trusted him. Razaleigh and Musa ran for the UMNO presidency and deputy presidency on a joint ticket against Mahathir and his new choice for deputy Ghafar Baba.

The tickets were known as Team B and Team A, respectively. Mahathir's Team A enjoyed the press's support, most party heavyweights, and even Iskandar, now the Agong. However, some significant figures, such as Abdullah Badawi supported Team B. In the election, held on 24 April 1987, Team A prevailed. Mahathir was re-elected by a narrow margin, receiving the votes of 761 party delegates to Razaleigh's 718. Ghafar defeated Musa by a slightly larger margin. Mahathir responded by purging seven Team B supporters from his ministry. At the same time, Team B refused to accept defeat and initiated litigation. In an unexpected decision in February 1988, the High Courts ruled that UMNO was an illegal organisation as some of its branches had not been lawfully registered.

Each faction raced to register a new party under the UMNO name. Mahathir's side successfully registered the name "UMNO Baru" ("new UMNO"), while Team B's application to register "UMNO Malaysia" was rejected. UMNO Malaysia, under Tengku Razaleigh Hamzah's leadership and support of both of Malaysia's surviving former prime ministers, Abdul Rahman and Hussein, registered the party Semangat 46 instead. The Lord President of the Supreme Court, Salleh Abas, sent a letter of protest to the Agong. Mahathir then suspended Salleh for "gross misbehaviour and conduct", ostensibly because the letter was a breach of protocol. A tribunal set up by Mahathir found Salleh guilty and recommended to the Agong that Salleh be dismissed. Five other judges of the court supported Salleh and were suspended by Mahathir. A newly constituted court dismissed Team B's appeal, allowing Mahathir's faction to continue to use the name UMNO. According to Milne and Mauzy, the episode destroyed the independence of Malaysia's judiciary.

At the same time as the political and judicial crises, Mahathir initiated a crackdown on opposition dissidents using the Internal Security Act. Mahathir later declared that it was only used to lock up people accused of riots, unlawful assembly, terrorism and those who have murdered police officers. The appointment of several administrators who did not speak Mandarin to Chinese schools provoked an outcry among Chinese Malaysians to the point where UMNO's coalition partners the Malaysian Chinese Association and Gerakan joined the Democratic Action Party (DAP) in protesting the appointments.

UMNO's Youth wing held a provocative protest that triggered a shooting by a lone Malay gunman. Only Mahathir's interference prevented UMNO from staging a larger protest. Instead, Mahathir ordered what Wain calls "the biggest crackdown on political dissent Malaysia had ever seen". Under a police operation codenamed "Operation Lalang", 119 people were arrested and detained without charge under the Internal Security Act. Mahathir argued that the detentions were necessary to prevent a repeat of the 1969 race riots. Most of the detainees were prominent opposition activists, including the DAP leader, Lim Kit Siang, and nine of his fellow MPs. Three newspapers sympathetic to the opposition were shut down.

Mahathir suffered a heart attack in early 1989. He recovered to lead Barisan Nasional to victory in the 1990 election. Semangat 46 failed to make any headway outside Razaleigh's home state of Kelantan.

Economic development to financial crisis (1990–1998) 

The expiry of the Malaysian New Economic Policy (NEP) in 1990 allowed Mahathir to outline his economic vision for Malaysia. In 1991, he announced Vision 2020, under which Malaysia would aim to become a fully developed country within 30 years. The target would require average economic growth of approximately seven per cent of gross domestic product per annum. One of Vision 2020's features would be to gradually break down ethnic barriers. Vision 2020 was accompanied by the NEP's replacement, the National Development Policy (NDP), under which some government programs designed to benefit the bumiputera exclusively were opened up to other ethnicities.

The NDP achieved success out one of its main aims, poverty reduction. By 1995, less than nine per cent of Malaysians lived in poverty, and income inequality had narrowed. Mahathir also introduced the Bangsa Malaysia policy, which aimed to facilitate greater representation of non-Malay ethnicities in Malaysia. Mahathir's government cut corporate taxes and liberalised financial regulations to attract foreign investment. The economy grew by over nine per cent per annum until 1997, prompting other developing countries to emulate Mahathir's policies. Much of the credit for Malaysia's economic development in the 1990s went to Anwar Ibrahim, appointed by Mahathir as finance minister in 1991. The government rode the economic wave and won the 1995 election with an increased majority.

Mahathir initiated a series of major infrastructure projects in the 1990s. One of the largest was the Multimedia Super Corridor, an area south of Kuala Lumpur, in the mould of Silicon Valley, designed to cater for the information technology industry. However, the project failed to generate the investment anticipated. Other Mahathir projects included the development of Putrajaya as the home of Malaysia's public service and bringing a Formula One Grand Prix to Sepang. One of the most controversial developments was the Bakun Dam in Sarawak. The ambitious hydro-electric project was intended to carry electricity across the South China Sea to satisfy electricity demand in peninsular Malaysia. Work on the dam was eventually suspended due to the Asian financial crisis. The 1997 Southeast Asian haze, the worst haze event in history caused by Indonesian forest fires, was a major air pollution crisis for the country; Mahathir launched a cross-border firefighting operation in response.

In 1997, the Asian financial crisis, which began in Thailand in mid-1997, threatened to devastate Malaysia. The value of the ringgit plummeted due to currency speculation, foreign investment fled, and the main stock exchange index fell by over 75 per cent. At the urging of the International Monetary Fund (IMF), the government cut government spending. It raised interest rates, which only served to exacerbate the economic situation. In 1998, in a controversial approach, Mahathir reversed this policy course in defiance of the IMF and his own deputy, Anwar. He increased government spending and fixed the ringgit to the US dollar. The result confounded his international critics and the IMF. Malaysia recovered from the crisis faster than its Southeast Asian neighbours. In the domestic sphere, it was a political triumph. Amidst the economic events of 1998, Mahathir had dismissed Anwar as finance minister and deputy prime minister. He could now claim to have rescued the economy despite Anwar's policies. Anwar led the reformasi movement against Mahathir's government in response.

In his second decade in office, Mahathir had again found himself battling Malaysia's royalty. In 1992, Sultan Iskandar's son, a representative field hockey player, was suspended from competition for five years for assaulting an opponent. Iskandar retaliated by pulling all Johor hockey teams out of national competitions. When a local coach criticised his decision, Iskandar ordered him to his palace and beat him. The federal parliament unanimously censured Iskandar, and Mahathir leapt at the opportunity to remove the constitutional immunity of the sultans from civil and criminal suits. The press backed Mahathir and, in an unprecedented development, started airing allegations of misconduct by members of Malaysia's royal families.

As the press revealed examples of the rulers' extravagant wealth, Mahathir resolved to cut financial support to royal households. With the press and the government pitted against them, the sultans capitulated to the government's proposals. Their powers to deny assent to bills were limited by further constitutional amendments passed in 1994. With the status and powers of the Malaysian royalty diminished, Wain writes that by the mid-1990s, Mahathir had become the country's "uncrowned king". His policies during his first premiership were later described as "authoritarian" by the BBC.

Final years and succession (1998–2003) 

By the mid-1990s, it became clear that the most serious threat to Mahathir's power was Anwar's leadership ambition. Anwar began to distance himself from Mahathir, overtly promoting his superior religious credentials and appearing to suggest he favoured loosening the restrictions on civil liberties that had become a hallmark of Mahathir's premiership. However, Mahathir continued to back Anwar as his successor until their relationship collapsed dramatically during the Asian financial crisis, with Mahathir abandoning the tight monetary and fiscal policies urged by the IMF. Anwar refused to bail-out Mahathir son, Mirzan Mahathir's, interests in Malaysian International Shipping Corp.

At the UMNO General Assembly in 1998, a leading Anwar supporter, Ahmad Zahid Hamidi, criticised the government for not doing enough to combat corruption and cronyism. As Mahathir took the reins of Malaysia's economic policy over the coming months, Anwar was increasingly sidelined. On 2 September, he was dismissed as deputy prime minister and finance minister and promptly expelled from UMNO. No immediate reasons were given for the dismissal. However, the media speculated that it related to lurid allegations of sexual misconduct circulated in a "poison pen letter" at the general assembly. As more allegations surfaced, large public rallies were held in support of Anwar. On 20 September, he was arrested and placed in detention under the Internal Security Act.

Anwar stood trial on four charges of corruption, arising from allegations that Anwar abused his power by ordering police to intimidate persons who had alleged Anwar had sodomised them. Before Anwar's trial, Mahathir told the press that he was convinced of Anwar's guilt. He was found guilty in April 1999 and sentenced to six years in prison. In another trial shortly after, Anwar was sentenced to another nine years in prison on a conviction for sodomy. The sodomy conviction was overturned on appeal after Mahathir left office.

While Mahathir had vanquished his rival, it came at a cost to his international community and domestic politics. US Secretary of State Madeleine Albright defended Anwar as a "highly respectable leader" who was "entitled to due process and a fair trial". In a speech in Kuala Lumpur, which Mahathir attended, US Vice-President Al Gore stated that "we continue to hear calls for democracy", including "among the brave people of Malaysia". At the APEC summit in 1999, Canadian Prime Minister Jean Chrétien refused to meet Mahathir, while his foreign minister met with Anwar's wife, Wan Azizah Wan Ismail. Wan Azizah had formed a liberal opposition party, the National Justice Party (Keadilan) to fight the 1999 election. UMNO lost 18 seats and two state governments as large numbers of Malay voters flocked to PAS and Keadilan, many in protest at the treatment of Anwar.

In September 2001, debate was caused by Mahathir's announcement that Malaysia was already an Islamic state. At UMNO's general assembly in 2002, he announced that he would resign as prime minister, only for supporters to rush to the stage and convince him tearfully to remain. He subsequently fixed his retirement for October 2003, giving him time to ensure an orderly and uncontroversial transition to his anointed successor, Abdullah Badawi. In a speech made before the Organization of the Islamic Conference shortly before he left office, Mahathir claimed "the Jews rule the world by proxy: They get others to fight and die for them." His speech was denounced by President George W. Bush. Having spent over 22 years in office, Mahathir was the world's longest-serving elected leader when he retired.

Foreign relations

During Mahathir's term, Malaysia's relationship with the West was collaborative, despite him being known as an outspoken critic. Early during his tenure, a small disagreement with the United Kingdom over university tuition fees sparked a boycott of all British goods led by Mahathir, in what became known as the "Buy British Last" campaign. It also led to a search for development models in Asia, most notably Japan. This was the beginning of his famous "Look East Policy". Although the dispute was later resolved by Prime Minister Margaret Thatcher, Mahathir continued to emphasise Asian development models over contemporary Western ones. He particularly criticised what he believed were the double standards of Western nations.

United States

Mahathir was publicly critical of the foreign policy of the United States from time to time, particularly during the George W. Bush presidency. Nevertheless, relations between the two countries were still positive. The United States was the biggest foreign investment source and was Malaysia's biggest customer during Mahathir's rule. Furthermore, Malaysian military officers continued to train in the US under the International Military Education And Training (IMET) program. The BBC reported that relations with the United States took a turn for the worse in 1998 when Al Gore, Vice President of the United States, gave a speech at the Asia-Pacific Economic Cooperation (APEC) conference hosted by Malaysia. Gore stated that:

Democracy confers a stamp of legitimacy that reforms must have in order to be effective. And so, among nations suffering economic crises, we continue to hear calls for democracy, calls for reform, in many languages – People Power, doi moi, reformasi. We hear them today – right here, right now – among the brave people of Malaysia.

Gore and the United States were critical of the trial of Mahathir's former deputy Anwar Ibrahim, going so far as to label it as a "show trial". U.S. News & World Report called the trial a "tawdry spectacle." Also, Anwar was the preeminent Malaysian spokesperson for the economic policies preferred by the IMF, which included interest-rate hikes. An article in Malaysia Today commented that "Gore's comments constituted a none-too-subtle attack on Malaysia's Prime Minister Mahathir Mohamad and more generally on governments, including Japan, that resist US demands for further market reforms."

During the ASEAN meeting in 1997, Mahathir made a speech condemning the Universal Declaration of Human Rights, suggesting its revision. He said that in Asia, the society's interests are more important than an individual's interests. He added that Asians need economic growth more than civil liberties. These remarks did not endear him to US Secretary of State Madeleine Albright, who was a guest at the meeting and paid a visit to Anwar's wife following his firing and subsequent imprisonment.

The United States government has previously criticised the Malaysian government for implementing the ISA, and Mahathir has not hesitated to point to the United States to justify his own actions. In speaking of arbitrary detention without trial of prisoners of conscience in Malaysia, he said: "Events in the United States have shown that there are instances where certain special powers need to be used in order to protect the public for the general good." In 2003, Mahathir spoke to the Non-Aligned Movement in Kuala Lumpur. He blamed Western nations and Israel for a global rise in terrorism: "If innocent people who died in the attack on Afghanistan and those who have been dying from lack of food and medical care in Iraq are considered collaterals, are the 3,000 who died in New York and the 200 in Bali also just collaterals whose deaths are necessary for operations to succeed?" He also said: "If we think back, there was no systematic campaign of terror outside Europe until the Europeans and the Jews created a Jewish state out of Palestinian land."

A 2003 house hearing by the Subcommittee on East Asia and the Pacific of the U.S. House International Relations Committee (now called the House Committee on Foreign Affairs) summarises the relationship between the United States and Malaysia as follows: "Despite sometimes blunt and intemperate public remarks by Prime Minister Mahathir, U.S.-Malaysian cooperation has a solid record in areas as diverse as education, trade, military relations, and counter-terrorism."

Australia
Mahathir's relationship with Australia (the closest country in the Anglosphere to Malaysia and the one whose foreign policy is most concentrated on the region) and his relationship with Australia's political leaders was particularly rocky. Relationships between Mahathir and Australia's leaders reached a low point in 1993 when Paul Keating described Mahathir as "recalcitrant" for not attending the APEC summit. The Malaysian government threatened trade sanctions as a response, while the Australian government claimed that Keating's description was a linguistic gaffe, and that what he had in mind was "intransigent".

Singapore
Relations with Singapore under Mahathir's tenure were stormy. Many disputed issues raised during his administration were still not resolved as of 2018. Issues included disputes about the Malaysia–Singapore Points of Agreement of 1990, a dispute over water prices, the proposed replacement of the Johor-Singapore Causeway and the dispute over the island Pedra Branca.

Bosnia and Herzegovina

Mahathir was a prominent international advocate for Bosniaks in Bosnia and Herzegovina during his tenure. His government permitted Bosnians to come to Malaysia without a visa during the Bosnian War. He was influential in the establishment of an OIC summit in Karachi in 1993 to discuss the need for weapons for Bosnia during the War.

Malaysia sent UN Peacekeeping forces to Bosnia and was part of the Contact Group advocating for Bosnia at the UN. Mahathir opened a bridge of Malaysian-Bosnian and Herzegovinian friendship in the Bosnian capital Sarajevo. In November 2009, he chaired a closed-door meeting of leading investors at the Malaysia Global Business Forum – Bosnia, which was attended by then-president Haris Silajdžić.

Interim years (2003–2018)

Post-first term premiership (2003–2015)

On his retirement, Mahathir was named a Grand Commander of the Order of the Defender of the Realm, allowing him to adopt the title of "Tun". He pledged to leave politics "completely", rejecting an emeritus role in Abdullah's cabinet. Abdullah immediately made his mark as a quieter and less adversarial premier. With much stronger religious credentials than Mahathir, he could beat back PAS's surge in the 1999 election and lead the Barisan Nasional in the 2004 election to its biggest win ever, taking 199 of 219 parliamentary seats.

Mahathir was the CEO and Chairman, and hence a senior adviser, for many flagship Malaysian companies such as Proton, Perdana Leadership Foundation and Malaysia's government-owned oil and gas company Petronas. Mahathir and Abdullah had a major fallout over Proton in 2005. Proton's chief executive, a Mahathir ally, had been sacked by the company's board. With Abdullah's blessing, Proton then sold one of its prise assets, the motorcycle company MV Agusta, which was bought on Mahathir's advice.

Mahathir criticised the awarding of import permits for foreign cars, which he claimed were causing Proton's domestic sales to suffer, and attacked Abdullah for cancelling the construction of a second causeway between Malaysia and Singapore. Mahathir complained that his views were not getting sufficient airing by the Malaysian press, the freedom of which he had curtailed while prime minister: he had been named one of the "Ten Worst Enemies of the Press" by the Committee to Protect Journalists for his restrictions on newspapers and occasional imprisonment of journalists.

He turned to the blogosphere in response, writing a column for Malaysiakini, an online media news website, and starting his own blog. He unsuccessfully sought election from his local party division to be a delegate to UMNO's general assembly in 2006, where he planned to initiate a revolt against Abdullah's leadership of the party. After the 2008 election, in which UMNO lost its two-thirds majority in Parliament, Mahathir resigned from the party. Abdullah was replaced by his deputy, Najib Razak, in 2009, a move that prompted Mahathir to rejoin the party.

Mahathir established the Kuala Lumpur Initiative to Criminalise War Forum in an effort to end war globally, as well as the Kuala Lumpur War Crimes Commission to investigate the activities of the United States, Israel and its allies in Iraq, Lebanon and the Palestinian territories. In March 2015, Perdana Global Peace Foundation held a conference called "The New World Order: Recipe for War or Peace" where he stated the core concept of New World Order is that an elite would rule the planet and that to achieve one world government they would have to exterminate billions of humans.

Return to politics (2015–2018)
Mahathir repeatedly called for Prime Minister Najib Razak to resign over the 1Malaysia Development Berhad (1MDB) corruption scandal. On 30 August 2015, he and his wife, Siti Hasmah, attended the Bersih 4 rally, which saw tens of thousands demonstrating for Najib's resignation. In 2016, Mahathir ignited several protests that culminated in the Malaysian Citizens' Declaration by himself with the help of Pakatan Harapan and NGOs to oust Najib. Najib's response to the corruption accusations was to tighten his grip on power by replacing the deputy prime minister, suspending two newspapers and pushing through parliament a controversial National Security Council Bill that provided the prime minister with unprecedented powers.

On Lee Kuan Yew's death in March 2015, Mahathir wrote an entry on his blog entitled "Kuan Yew and I". He expressed his sorrow and grief at the loss of Lee. He said that he often disagreed with the veteran Singaporean leader but bore him no enmity for the differences of opinion on what was good for the newborn nation to thrive. He wrote that with Lee's death, ASEAN had lost the strong leadership of both Lee as well as President Suharto of Indonesia, who had died earlier in 2008.

Many political analysts believe that with Lee's death, Mahathir is the last of the "Old Guard" of Southeast Asia. On the anniversary of Lee Kuan Yew's death. Mahathir told the media that Singaporeans must value Lee Kuan Yew's contributions because he industrialised Singapore. He said: "That is one achievement that we need to recognise." With Lee, Mahathir "had no problems." He said that he does not view Lee "as an enemy and all that, but as a Singapore leader who had his own stand that was not the same with the stand of Malaysia."

Mahathir left UMNO in 2016, forming the Parti Pribumi Bersatu Malaysia (BERSATU). The new party was officially registered on 9 September 2016, and Mahathir became its chairman. By 2017, he had officially joined the opposition coalition Pakatan Harapan. He was proposed as a possible chairman and prime ministerial candidate of Pakatan Harapan. He assumed the position of chairman on 14 July 2017.

On 14 October 2017, referencing the 1MDB scandal, Mahathir said of Najib Razak; "a prime minister who came from 'Bugis pirates' is now leading Malaysia". He remarked, "go back to Sulawesi", which aroused discontent from the Bugis descendants in Malaysia and Indonesia, who protested against him. On 8 February 2018, Mahathir's Darjah Kerabat Al-Yunusi (DK Kelantan) was revoked by the Kelantan royal house, alongside two of his Pakatan Harapan colleagues, with no reason given.

On 8 January 2018, Mahathir was announced as the Pakatan Harapan opposition alliance's prime ministerial candidate for the election to be held on 9 May 2018, seeking to oust his former ally Najib. Wan Azizah, wife of his former political enemy Anwar, ran as his deputy. Mahathir's election promise was to seek a pardon for Anwar, in order to allow him to take over as prime minister after an unspecified interim period.

Second term as prime minister (2018–2020)

Following Pakatan Harapan's election victory on 10 May 2018, Mahathir hoped to be sworn in as the new prime minister by 5pm. Concerns for a smooth power transition emerged as Najib, although admitting the defeat of his party and coalition during a press conference at 11 am, declared that no party has achieved a simple majority win (due to the fact that the opposing coalition were competing as allied individual parties, and was not successfully registered as a single unit by the Electoral Committee). The appointment of the office was therefore responsibility of Malaysia's monarch. Nevertheless, the National Palace of Malaysia had promptly issued a royal statement, confirming Mahathir Mohamad will be sworn in as the prime minister at 9:30 pm, on the same day (10 May 2018), and had strongly refuted any claims of delaying the appointment. At 10 pm, Mahathir was officially sworn in as prime minister.

Mahathir became the world's oldest serving state leader (aged  at the time), and the first Malaysian prime minister not to represent UMNO. His deputy, Wan Azizah became the first female deputy prime minister of Malaysia.

In April 2019, Mahathir was listed among Time magazine’s 100 most influential people in 2019.

Domestic affairs
Following his appointment as prime minister, Mahathir promised to "restore the rule of law", and make elaborate and transparent investigations into the 1Malaysia Development Berhad scandal. Mahathir told the press that Najib Razak would face consequences if found guilty of wrongdoing. Mahathir instructed the Department of Immigration bar Najib and his wife Rosmah Mansor from leaving the country after they attempted to fly to Indonesia.

Mahathir formed his seventh cabinet of 29 ministers in June 2018. He abolished the unpopular Goods and Services Tax, reducing it from six to zero per cent. Mahathir also vowed to cut fiscal spending by firing thousands of civil servants, cancelling an expensive Kuala Lumpur–Singapore high-speed rail link and cutting back on large infrastructure projects initiated under Najib. Malaysia's freedom of the press improved slightly under Mahathir's tenure, and the country's rank rose in the Press Freedom Index.

On 20 June 2018, Mahathir met the father of murdered Mongolian woman Altantuya Shaariibuu and agreed that the case of her murder should be reopened.

Mahathir announced the Shared Prosperity Vision 2030 in October 2019, which set out to increase the incomes all ethnic groups, to increase focus on the technology sector and for Malaysia to become a high income country by 2030. In the announcement, he vowed to move pass what he called the "abuse of power" and "corruption" of the previous administration to achieve this.

Another priority of his administration was a more transparent approach to defence, and would release the country's first defense policy white paper outlining long-term plans for the country.

Foreign relations

 
Early in his second tenure, Mahathir visited Japan and Indonesia to reaffirm good relations, and reignited a water dispute with Singapore. Mahathir strengthened economic and defence ties with Russia. He visited Vladivostok for a meeting of the Eastern Economic Forum in late 2019, where he cast doubt on the Joint Investigation Team's findings related to the downing of Malaysia Airlines Flight 17. Malaysia launched a foreign policy framework in late 2019.

Mahathir condemned the killing of Saudi journalist Jamal Khashoggi in October 2018 and the assassination of Iranian General Qasem Soleimani by the United States in 2020.

Mahathir refused to extradite Zakir Naik, an Indian Islamic preacher who was accused of money laundering by Indian authorities. Mahathir extradited Turkish national Arif Komis and his family, who were holding UNHCR refugee cards, in August 2019. Komis was later charged by the Turkish government for being part of the Gülen movement.

Mahathir received an honorary doctorate from Qatar University in December 2019.

North Korea
Mahathir was supportive of the 2018–19 Korean peace process. He said, "the world should not treat North Korean leader Kim Jong-un with scepticism and instead learn from his new attitude towards bringing about peace". In a joint press conference in Tokyo with Japan after the 2018 US-North Korea summit, Mahathir said, "we hoped for a successful outcome from the historic meeting", adding that "Malaysia will re-open their embassy in North Korea as an end to the diplomatic row over the assassination of Kim Jong-nam last year".

Israel and Palestine 
The 2019 World Para Swimming Championships were set to take place in Malaysia, but Mahathir's government announced it would ban athletes from Israel from the competition in solidarity with the Palestinian National Authority. The Malaysian Paralympic Council said they were following government policy, as Malaysia bans Israeli passport holders from entering the country. Mahathir stood by the decision, saying that Israel is "a criminal nation which does not obey international laws" and stressed that two countries would not establish ties. On 27 January 2019, Malaysia was stripped of their hosting rights because of the decision, and on 15 April 2019, London was announced as the replacement host.

China and Hong Kong

Mahathir's administration was committed to retaining good relations with China, but promised to review all Belt and Road Initiative projects in Malaysia that were initiated by the previous government. He characterised these as "unequal treaties", and the government suspended work on the East Coast Rail Link and continued it after terms had been renegotiated. Mahathir cancelled approximately $2.8 billion worth of deals with China Petroleum Pipeline Bureau altogether, saying Malaysia would not be able to repay its obligations to China.

Mahathir said about China's treatment of its Uyghur Muslim minority in Xinjiang, "We can condemn [China] but the fact is that the condemnation alone would not achieve anything."

In 2019, Mahathir said he is in the opinion that Carrie Lam should resign as the Chief Executive of Hong Kong, fearing a repeat of the 1989 Tiananmen Square protests. He added that Lam already knew "the consequences of rejecting [the extradition] law" as she was in a dilemma when she has to obey her Mainland masters.

On 13 February 2020, Mahathir communicated his solidarity with Chinese President Xi Jinping as China responded to the COVID-19 outbreak. The Foreign Ministry released a statement saying that the two leaders had a 30-minute phone conversation on the ongoing epidemic, and spoke of mutual understanding and close cooperation in dealing with the epidemic and to minimise its impact.

2020 political crisis and resignation 

According to Reuters, Mahathir and other MPs had begun discussing forming a new coalition government to avoid passing the premiership to Anwar Ibrahim in late 2019, in contrast with the pre-election agreement. Mahathir felt that Anwar would be unable to command a parliamentary majority. Opposition party members Muhyiddin Yassin and Azmin Ali had approached Mahathir about forming one, but Mahathir declined, refusing to work with any UMNO leaders over ongoing corruption trials.

In February 2020, disagreements over who should lead the government caused the Pakatan Harapan coalition to collapse and culminated in a political crisis. MPs supporting Anwar first confronted Mahathir in a meeting and demanded a timeframe for his resignation and the handover of power to Anwar. Other MPs from several political parties held their own meetings to discuss forming a new government, with Mahathir remaining Prime Minister; Mahathir himself was not present. Around 131 MPs, including various opposition party leaders, gathered at the Sheraton Hotel, Petaling Jaya for a dinner party celebrating a "consensus" among MPs. Anwar Ibrahim later confirmed that the attempt to create a new governing coalition made up of BERSATU and a faction of the PKR, adding that he had been "betrayed".

Anwar, Mahathir and other Pakatan leaders met the following day to seek clarification; Mahathir said he was not involved in the attempt to form a new governing coalition.

Mahathir submitted his resignation to the Yang di-Pertuan Agong Abdullah of Pahang on 24 February 2020, refusing to work with UMNO leaders in a new government. The Agong accepted Mahathir's resignation, and appointed him as interim prime minister until a replacement could be appointed. BERSATU President Muhyiddin Yassin declared the party's withdrawal from the Pakatan Harapan coalition, causing a loss of parliamentary majority; Mahathir resigned from the party in response.

On 29 February, the Agong appointed Muhyiddin prime minister, determining that he was "most likely to have received the trust of the majority" of MPs. Muhyiddin was sworn in as prime minister the following day. Mahathir challenged this, but his attempts to contact the Agong to seek legitimacy for his support were not answered. He left the Prime Minister's office an hour before Muhyiddin was sworn in.

Post–second term premiership (2020–present) 

In response to Muhyiddin becoming prime minister, Mahathir formed a new party, Homeland Fighters' Party (PEJUANG), in August 2020. Four other MPs joined the new party, including Mahathir's son Mukhriz Mahathir. The party was registered as an official party as of 8 July 2021.

In May 2021, Mahathir expressed hope that incoming President Joe Biden would be able to repair the United States' relationship with China, after his predecessor Donald Trump's aggressive approach toward the Xi Jinping administration soured diplomatic ties. He said countries in the Quadrilateral Security Dialogue, or Quad, should be careful not to enrage China lest they trigger a heavy global economic backlash.

In August 2021, Mahathir joined other MPs in a protest in Merdeka Square calling for Muhyiddin's resignation over his government's response to the COVID-19 pandemic, after they were blocked from entering parliament by police.

On 20 April 2022, UMNO president Ahmad Zahid Hamidi filed a defamation lawsuit against Mahathir. In June 2022, at an event organised by several non-government organisations titled Aku Melayu: Survival Bermula (I am Malay: Survival Begins), Mahathir made irrendentist comments by stating that Singapore and the Riau Islands of Indonesia was once owned by Johor, and the state of Johor should attempt to have them returned to the state and Malaysia.

In August 2022 during Nancy Pelosi's visit, he accused the United States of trying to start a war with China over Taiwan.

On 24 September 2022, he added that he was open to becoming the prime minister for a third time if there were no suitable candidates available for the position. Having previously said he would not be contesting or defending his Langkawi parliamentary seat in the next election, on 11 October 2022 he confirmed that he would contest in the general election later that year. On 19 November 2022, Mahathir Mohamad lost his parliamentary seat in Langkawi, his first election defeat in 53 years, losing his deposit and coming in fourth in a five-cornered fight. No candidate from PEJUANG or Gerakan Tanah Air secured a seat. In light of his defeat, he said he and his party's plans "had to be dropped" and he would shift his focus to writing about Malaysian history.

On 25 February 2023, Mahathir and 13 former PEJUANG members joined Parti Bumiputera Perkasa Malaysia (Putra) after leaving PEJUANG on 10 February.

Political positions and views
Mahathir's political views have shifted considerably during his lengthy career. During the 1980s, he was a supporter of Third-Worldism, while during other periods he has been a proponent of "Asian values" and globalization. He has been described as a proponent of Malay nationalism. A Muslim thinker, he holds Islamic political views. Among developing and Islamic countries, Mahathir is generally respected, particularly due to Malaysia's economic growth during his tenure, as well as Mahathir's support of liberal Muslim values. Mahathir is a critic of neoliberalism. He has been described as anti-royalist by Libération, and particularly opposed immunity for members of Malaysia's monarchies.

In The Malay Dilemma, he argued that the Malay race had been marginalised, and voiced his support for affirmative action policies for them. Upon his first resignation, he said that he was "disappointed... because I have achieved too little in my principal task of making my race a successful race, a race that is respected". In 2021, Mahathir said he did not believe in "Ketuanan Melayu", calling it a "fantasy", and said instead that he believed in "Bangsa Malaysia".

Mahathir is a vocal critic of the Western world and its geopolitics. In 2011, Mahathir suggested that the September 11 attacks might have been staged by the United States government. He is particularly critical of the foreign policy of the United States, and in 2015 claimed the USA and its allies fabricated the war on terror to achieve global hegemony.

Allegations of antisemitism 

A strident critic of Israel, Mahathir has been accused of antisemitism since at least as far back as in The Malay Dilemma in which he wrote that "Jews are not merely hook-nosed, but understand money instinctively". In August 1983, Mahathir claimed in a speech that Jews control the international media. In March 1994, he banned the screening of Schindler's List on the grounds that he viewed it as anti-German, pro-Jewish propaganda. During the collapse of the ringgit and the economic crisis in 1997, he made a series of remarks blaming Jews, in particular George Soros, a Jewish "agenda," and "an international Jewish conspiracy" attempting to destroy the economies of Muslim countries. 

During an Organization of Islamic Cooperation summit held in Kuala Lumpur in 2003, he accused Jews of "ruling the world by proxy" and getting "others to fight and die for them". In 2012 he claimed he was "glad to be labeled antisemitic". In a 2018 BBC interview he repeated similar statements, as well as disputing the number of Jews killed in the Holocaust. In 2019, when asked why he had previously claimed that Jews are "inclined towards money" he responded that he had Jewish friends, and that "they are not like the other Jews, that's why they are my friends." Mahathir has defended his comments about Jews as an exercise of free speech, and by claiming that "the Jews do a lot of wrong things which force us to pass comment."

LGBT rights 
Mahathir opposes an expansion of LGBT rights in Malaysia. During an October 2018 lecture to university students in Bangkok, Thailand, Mahathir expressed resistance to expanding LGBT rights in Malaysia. Contrasting them with those in Western nations, he said "we do not accept LGBT but if they want to accept, that is their business. Don't force it on us... The institution of marriage, the institution of the family has now been disregarded in the West. Why should we follow that? Our value system is as good".

Comment about 2020 Nice stabbing 
On 29 October 2020, in the aftermath of the 2020 Nice stabbing, Mahathir posted remarks on his blog. Regarding the murder of Samuel Paty, Mahathir said it was against "the teachings of Islam", and "the killing is not an act that as a Muslim I would approve". He also said: "The French in the course of their history has killed millions of people. Many were Muslims. Muslims have a right to be angry and to kill millions of French people for the massacres of the past. But by and large the Muslims have not applied the ‘eye for an eye’ law. Muslims don't. The French shouldn't. Instead the French should teach their people to respect other people's feeling." Mahathir's post was later circulated on his Twitter account. His tweet was later labeled by Twitter for "glorifying violence".

Mahathir was criticized for stoking tensions and hatred by the former Australian ambassador to France Brendan Berne, Australian prime minister Scott Morrison, and French secretary of state for digital affairs Cédric O; the latter of whom called for the suspension of Mahathir's Twitter account. Berne demanded context regarding Mahathir's comments and stated that Mahathir's comments do not represent Muslims. Malaysian cleric and politician Fathul Bari Mat Jahya condemned Mahathir's remarks, calling them "reprehensible tribalism" and declaring that they contradicted Islamic teachings. He urged Mahathir to take heart the lesson behind the Christchurch mosque shootings.

Mahathir responded that his comments were taken out of context and he was not "promoting massacre of the French." After Facebook and Twitter removed his posts, Mahathir criticised the social media platforms' decision to remove his posts, accusing them of shielding those who had offended Muslims and made fun of the Islamic prophet Muhammad.

Personal life

Marriage and family
In college, he met his future wife, Siti Hasmah Mohamad Ali, a fellow medical student. They were married in 1956. He and Siti Hasmah had their first child, Marina, in 1957, before conceiving four others, Mirzan, Mokhzani, Melinda, and Mukhriz, as well as adopting two more, Maizura, and Mazhar over the following 28 years.

Health 
Mahathir underwent a heart bypass operation in 2007, following two heart attacks over the previous two years. He had undergone the same operation after his heart attack in 1989. After the 2007 operation, he suffered a chest infection. He was hospitalised for treatment of another chest infection in 2010.

In December 2021, Mahathir was admitted to the Institut Jantung Negara (IJN) for a medical check-up and observation. He was discharged after several days.

In January 2022, Mahathir underwent an unspecified elective medical procedure at the Malaysian National Heart Institute (IJN) and was discharged six days later. He was readmitted later the same month, and placed in the coronary care unit. After spending more time recovering in hospital a after being moved to a regular ward from intensive care,  he was discharged on for continued rehabilitation and treatment.

In August 2022, Mahathir tested positive for COVID-19. He was admitted to the National Heart Institute for observation for several days. He was discharged after receiving treatment.

Election results

Honors, awards and recognitions

Books
 The Malay Dilemma, (1970) .
 The Challenge, (1986) .
 Regionalism, Globalism, and Spheres of Influence: ASEAN and the Challenge of Change into the 21st century (1989) .
 Mahathir, Great Malaysian Hero (1990) .
 The Asia That Can Say No (「NO」と言えるアジア), in collaboration with Shintaro Ishihara, (1994) .
 The Pacific Rim in the 21st century, (1995).
 The Challenges of Turmoil, (1998) .
 The Way Forward, (1998) .
 A New Deal for Asia, (1999).
 Islam & The Muslim Ummah, (2001) .
 Globalisation and the New Realities (2002).
 Reflections on Asia, (2002) .
 The Malaysian Currency Crisis: How and why it Happened, (2003) .
 Achieving True Globalization, (2004) .
 Islam, Knowledge, and Other Affairs, (2006) .
 Principles of Public Administration: An Introduction, (2007) .
 Chedet.com Blog Merentasi Halangan (Bilingual), (2008) .
 A Doctor in the House: The Memoirs of Tun Dr Mahathir Mohamad, 8 March 2011 .
 Doktor Umum: Memoir Tun Dr. Mahathir Mohamad, 30 April 2012 .
Blogging to Unblock (Book 2): A Citizen's Rights, (2013) .
Dr. M: Apa Habaq Orang Muda?, (2016) .
 Capturing Hope: The Struggle Continues for a New Malaysia, (2021) .

Notes

References

Cited texts

 
 
 
 
 
 
 James Chin & Joern Dosch. Malaysia Post Mahathir: a decade of change?. Marshall Cavendish. 2016.

External links
 

 

|-

|-

|-

|-

|-

|-

|-

|-

|-

|-

|-

|-

|-

|-

1925 births
Living people
People from Kedah
Malaysian anti-communists
Malaysian people of Malayali descent
Malaysian politicians of Indian descent
Malaysian people of Malay descent
Malaysian Muslims
 
Malaysian general practitioners
Malaysian writers
Leaders of political parties in Malaysia
Former Malaysian United Indigenous Party politicians
Presidents of United Malays National Organisation
Former United Malays National Organisation politicians
Malaysian political party founders
Members of the Dewan Negara
Members of the Dewan Rakyat
Prime Ministers of Malaysia
Deputy Prime Ministers of Malaysia
Government ministers of Malaysia
Defence ministers of Malaysia
Education ministers of Malaysia
Finance ministers of Malaysia
Home ministers of Malaysia
Justice ministers of Malaysia
Secretaries-General of the Non-Aligned Movement
Recipients of the Nishan-e-Quaid-i-Azam
Foreign recipients of the Nishan-e-Pakistan
Commanders of the National Order of the Cedar
Grand Commanders of the Order of the Defender of the Realm
Recipients of the Order of the Crown of Johor
Knights Grand Commander of the Order of the Crown of Johor
Knights Grand Commander of the Most Exalted Order of the Star of Sarawak
Knights Grand Commander of the Order of the Star of Hornbill Sarawak
Grand Commanders of the Order of Kinabalu
First Classes of Royal Family Order of Selangor
Grand Crosses of the National Order of Mali
Recipients of the Order of the Liberator General San Martin
Grand Cordons of the Order of Merit (Lebanon)
Commanders Grand Cross of the Order of the Polar Star
Grand Crosses of the Order of Merit of the Republic of Poland
Grand Cordons of the Order of the Rising Sun
Recipients of the Order of the Paulownia Flowers
Recipients of the Medal of the Oriental Republic of Uruguay
National University of Singapore alumni
University of Malaya alumni
20th-century Malaysian politicians
21st-century Malaysian politicians
Antisemitism in Asia
First Classes of the Royal Family Order of Johor
Recipients of the Kedah Supreme Order of Merit
9/11 conspiracy theorists
Malaysian bloggers